Singorgarh Fort, in the Damoh district of Madhya Pradesh state in Central India, is a hill-fort of Garha Kingdom, spread over the hills of a forested area. It is about 45 km from Jabalpur city, on the way to Damoh town. It was a magnificent fort and a residence of Rajgond rulers of Central India who spent part of each year there. It is presently under the archeological survey of india. The site must be accessed by bike,car or bus as there is proper road to it.

In its peak years, thousands of people lived at the fort, which was spread over large area. Many of its former watch towers are still visible. There is a pond on the hilltop that provided water. The fort was attacked in June, 1564 during the last war of the Gondwana Kingdom dynasty, under the rule of Rani Durgavati. At that time, Rani Durgavati, the ruling Queen of Gondwana, resided there; she later moved to Chouragarh Fort in Narsinghpur.

References 

Forts in Madhya Pradesh
Damoh district